The Chase Is On is an album by saxophonists Charlie Rouse and Paul Quinichette recorded in 1957 and released on the Bethlehem label.

Reception
The Allmusic review by Michael G. Nastos awarded the album 4 stars and stated "The combination of Rouse and Quinichette was a very satisfactory coupling of two talented and promising post-swing to bop individualists, who played to all of their strengths and differences on this worthy -- and now legendary -- session".

Track listing
 "The Chase Is On" (Harold Tubbs) - 3:18
 "When the Blues Come On" (Al Cohn, Charles Isaiah Darwin) - 5:48
 "This Can't Be Love" (Lorenz Hart, Richard Rodgers) - 5:24
 "Last Time for Love" (Carmen McRae) - 4:30
 "You're Cheating Yourself"  (Al Hoffman, Dick Manning) - 5:15
 "Knittin'" (Charlie Rouse) - 6:19
 "Tender Trap" (Sammy Cahn, Jimmy Van Heusen) - 4:24
 "The Things I Love" (Harold Barlow, Lew Harris) - 3:24

Personnel
Charlie Rouse,  Paul Quinichette - tenor saxophone
Hank Jones (tracks 2 & 5), Wynton Kelly (tracks 1, 3, 4 & 6-8) - piano 
Freddie Green - guitar (tracks 2 & 5)
Wendell Marshall - bass
Ed Thigpen - drums

References

Bethlehem Records albums
Charlie Rouse albums
Paul Quinichette albums
1958 albums